A cyanostar (pentacyanopentabenzo[25]annulene) is a shape-persistent macrocycle that binds anions.

Synthesis 
The cyanostar structure is synthesized in a one-pot process among five equivalents of a benzaldehyde bearing a meta-cyanomethyl substituent. A series of Knoevenagel condensation reactions catalyzed by various bases stitches them together to make the C5-symmetric structure.

Anion binding 
Cyanostar binds anions through hydrogen bonding from the C–H hydrogen bonds, as the hydrogen has a slight positive charge. It is the first binder to make use of cyanostilbene's electropositive CH groups. The hydrogen bonds create an electropositive region in the center of the macrocycle, creating a binding pocket. Cyanostar strongly binds anions that usually can only be bound weakly. The increased binding arises from the formation of a 2:1 complex, with two cyanostars sandwiching the anion on each side. An extended version of this structural pattern is a 4:3 alternating stack of cyanostar molecules complexing a hydrogen-bonded chain of dihydrogen phosphate units.

Rotaxanes 
Two cyanostars can be threaded onto a phosphate diester structure, forming a rotaxane. Because they have a high affinity for the central phosphate group only when it is in its anionic form, there is a substantial and reversible structural change in response to acid–base changes in solution.

References 

Macrocycles